Dr. Abdul Moyeen Khan (born 1 January 1947) is a Bangladesh Nationalist Party politician. He is a member of the current Standing Committee of the Party. He served as the Minister of State for Planning, Government of Bangladesh during 1993-1996, Minister of Information during 2001–2002 and the Minister of Science and Information & Communication Technology (now renamed) during 2002–2006. He served as a Member of Bangladesh Parliament from 1991 until 2006.

Background
Khan is the son of Abdul Momen Khan, formerly the top Civil Servant in Bangladesh (Cabinet Secretary) and a former Bangladesh Nationalist Party (BNP) politician, a founder member of BNP and the Minister of Food in the Cabinet of President Ziaur Rahman.

Dr Khan, an academic by profession, topped all exams in schools and colleges in his life with awards and gold medals, graduated as a PhD from the University of Sussex in 1973 and was a Professor of Physics in the University of Dhaka until 1991 when he first successfully ran for the fifth Parliament in 1991 and was elected the MP for Narsingdi 2 Constituency. He then ran successively in 3 following Parliaments and continued representing his constituency as the MP until 2006.

Career
In December 2009, Khan became a member of BNP's Standing Committee, the highest policy planning body of the Party.

References 

Living people
1947 births
People from Narsingdi District
Notre Dame College, Dhaka alumni
Alumni of the University of Sussex
Bangladesh Nationalist Party politicians
5th Jatiya Sangsad members
6th Jatiya Sangsad members
7th Jatiya Sangsad members
8th Jatiya Sangsad members
Information ministers of Bangladesh
Place of birth missing (living people)